George Patrick Tory (3 June 1899 – 29 March 1952) was an Australian rules footballer who played with Collingwood in the Victorian Football League (VFL).

He later played for Hawthorn in the Victorian Football Association.

Notes

External links 
		
George Tory's profile at Collingwood Forever

1899 births
1952 deaths
People from Omeo
Australian rules footballers from Victoria (Australia)
Collingwood Football Club players
Hawthorn Football Club (VFA) players
Australian military personnel of World War I